The World Fireworks Championship was held in  2010 at Al Qurum Natural Park in Muscat, Oman as part of the Sultanate’s 40th National Day Celebrations. It occurred over three successive weekends, with a reported 750,000 people attending. It featured six firework companies, and the winner was the French company, Lacroix Ruggieri. 

Each pyromusical display was broadcast live on the radio or television.

The World Fireworks Championship Results

Gallery

See also
Fireworks competitions
Fireworks

External links

 World Fireworks Championship Official website

 
Pyrotechnics